Irancheh (also Romanized as Īrāncheh; also known as Īrān) is a village in Dastgerd Rural District (Chaharmahal and Bakhtiari Province), in the Central District of Farrokhshahr County, Chaharmahal and Bakhtiari Province, Iran. At the 2006 census, its population was 523, in 137 families. 

distribution: Chahar Mahal va Bakhtiari Province|url=http://iranatlas.net/index.html?module=module.language-distribution.chahar_mahal_va_bakhtiari#|url-status=live|access-date=25 March 2021|website=Iran Atlas}}</ref>

References 

Populated places in Kiar County
Luri settlements in Chaharmahal and Bakhtiari Province